HCA Florida Sarasota Doctors Hospital (previously Doctors Hospital of Sarasota) is a 155-bed private health care facility located in Sarasota County, Florida. The hospital was founded in 1967 and is a part of the HCA Healthcare hospital system. 

In March 2018, Doctors Hospital opened a freestanding emergency room in nearby Manatee County, Florida named Doctors Hospital of Sarasota ER in Lakewood Ranch. The facility is located on State Road 70, east of I-75.

The hospital was renamed to its current name in June 2022.

References

Hospitals in Florida
Buildings and structures in Sarasota County, Florida
Hospital buildings completed in 1967